Pass away is a euphemism for die.

Passed away may also refer to:
Passed Away (film), an American ensemble comedy film from 1992
Passed Away, Vol. 1, a digital compilation by Dr. Dog

See also
Past Away (album), a 2004 album by the band Vietnam